Jordan Kyrou (born May 5, 1998) is a Canadian professional ice hockey right winger for the St. Louis Blues of the National Hockey League (NHL). Kyrou was selected 35th overall in the 2016 NHL Entry Draft by the Blues.

Playing career
Kyrou first played junior hockey as a youth after moving to Mississauga, Ontario. Whilst playing for the Mississauga AAA Senators, Kyrou was selected with the 38th overall pick in the 2014 OHL Priority Selection draft by the Sarnia Sting. He was signed to a standard players contract with the Sting on July 7, 2014. Kyrou completed the 2014–15 season in making his OHL debut with the Sarnia Sting, featuring in 63 games and accumulating 36 points.

At the completion of his second full major junior season with Sarnia in the 2015–16 season, Kyrou was selected in the second-round, 35th overall, of the 2016 NHL Entry Draft by the St. Louis Blues. On July 27, 2016, Kyrou was signed by the Blues to a three-year, entry-level contract. Before the 2017–18 season, and his fourth season with the Sarnia Sting, Kyrou was named captain of the Stings. At the end of the 2017–18 season Kyrou was awarded the Jim Mahon Memorial Trophy as the OHL's top scoring right winger after he led all right wingers with 109 points.

Kyrou made the Blues opening night roster for the 2018–19 season after attending training camp, and subsequently made his NHL debut on October 4 against the Winnipeg Jets. He recorded his first NHL point, an assist, on October 12 in 5–3 win over the Calgary Flames and his first career NHL goal on December 9, 2018, in a loss to the Vancouver Canucks.

Kyrou began the 2019–20 season on the injured list and was sent down to the San Antonio Rampage (AHL) upon recovery. He was recalled to the St. Louis Blues on December 9, 2019, and scored his first goal of the season on December 16, 2019, in a 5–2 win over the Colorado Avalanche.

On August 3, 2021, the Blues re-signed Kyrou to a two-year, $5.6 million contract.

Kyrou was selected to play in the 2022 All Star Game and competed in the Fastest Skater competition, which he won.

On September 13, 2022, Kyrou signed an eight-year, $65 million extension with the Blues.

International play

Kyrou played for Canada's Gold medal winning team at the 2018 World Junior Ice Hockey Championships.

Personal life
Kyrou is of Greek descent, with his paternal grandparents, Iordanis "John", and Maria, "Mary" (née Broumas) being Greek immigrants. His parents are Aki and Roula (née Economou), and he has two younger siblings, Matina and Christian. His brother Christian also plays ice hockey and committed to play for the Erie Otters in 2019  and was selected by the Dallas Stars 50th Overall in the 2022 NHL Entry Draft

During the pause in play due to COVID-19, Kyrou competed in a league wide Fortnite tournament for charity with teammates Robert Thomas and Vince Dunn. Together, they finished in second place and donated $50,000 to the St. Louis Children's Hospital, $25,000 to the St. Louis Area Foodbank, and $25,000 to muscular dystrophy research.

Career statistics

Regular season and playoffs

International

Awards and honours

References

External links

1998 births
Living people
Canadian ice hockey centres
Chicago Wolves players
Ice hockey people from Toronto
St. Louis Blues draft picks
St. Louis Blues players
San Antonio Rampage players
Sarnia Sting players